Cudgen is a town located in north-eastern New South Wales, Australia, in the Tweed Shire. It is built on the former land of the Coodjingburra clan of the Minyungbal. There is a primary school on Collier Street, the Cudgen Public School.

Demographics
In the 2016 Census, Cudgen recorded a population of 857 people, 50% female and 50% male.

The median age of the Cudgen population was 39 years, 2 years above the national median of 37.

85.4% of people living in Cudgen were born in Australia. The other top responses for country of birth were England 3.1%, New Zealand 1.5%, Thailand 0.6%, Scotland 0.5%, Japan 0.5%.

94.1% of people spoke only English at home; the next most common languages were 0.9% Japanese, 0.4% Turkish, 0.4% Italian, 0.4% Thai, 0.4% Czech.

Sport and recreation
The Cudgen Hornets is the local rugby league club that competes in the Northern Rivers Regional Rugby League competition.

References 

Suburbs of Tweed Heads, New South Wales
Coastal towns in New South Wales